Frank Cooper may refer to:

 Frank B. Cooper (1855–1930), American education administrator, superintendent of Seattle Public Schools, 1901–1922
 Frank Arthur Cooper (1872–1949), premier of Queensland, 1942–1946
 Frank Cooper (judge) (1869–1946), U.S. federal judge
 Frank Cooper (civil servant) (1922–2002), British civil servant
 Frank Cooper (musicologist) (born 1938), American professor of musicology
 Frank Cooper Jr., fictional character from the American TV program Guiding Light
 Frank Cooper III (born 1960s), business executive and chief marketing officer for PepsiCo, Inc.
 Frank Irving Cooper (1867–1933), American architect
 Frank Cowper (Frank Cooper, 1849–1930), British yachtsman and author
 Frank Cooper's, a British jam manufacturer founded in Oxford, England
 Franklin S. Cooper (1908–1999), American physicist, inventor, and speech researcher
 Gary Cooper (Frank James Cooper, 1901–1961), American actor

See also 
 Frank B. Cooper School, elementary school in Seattle, Washington